Medekšiai (formerly) is a village in Kėdainiai district municipality, in Kaunas County, in central Lithuania. According to the 2011 census, the village had a population of 184 people. A phosphogypsum waste dump of "Lifosa" fertilizer factory is located next to Medekšiai.

History
Medekšiai has been known since the 15th century. King Jogaila presented the village to a certain Proszczy whose nickname was Medekša. Pranciškus Medekša, a judge of Kovensky Uyezd, had been native of this family. In the end of the 19th century Medekšiai was a property of the Geištarai. Činkiai village and Slabadėlė folwark belonged to the Medekšiai Manor.

During the Soviet era, Medekšiai was a subsidiary settlement of the "Spike" kolkhoz.

Demography

Images

References

Villages in Kaunas County
Kėdainiai District Municipality